The Associated Grammar Schools of Victoria (AGSV) is a sporting association of nine independent schools in Victoria, Australia, formed in 1920. The AGSV provides interschool sporting competitions between the nine member schools in a range of sports across Summer and Winter seasons, as well as additional premiership sports. Following the end of each season, the AGSV selects top-performing students from any of the schools to compete in a representative competition against the Associated Public Schools of Victoria (APS).

During the Summer season (October to March), the AGSV coordinates competitions between the member schools in Summer sports such as Basketball, Cricket, Summer Hockey and Tennis amongst others. During the Winter season (April to August), sports played include Football, Soccer, Winter Hockey and Cross Country amongst others. In addition to the two main seasons, other premiership sports played include Swimming (February to March), Athletics (July to September) and Water Polo (July to September).

History
The AGSV was founded in 1920 to provide an alternative to the Associated Public Schools of Victoria (APS). There were nine founding member schools: All Saints Grammar School, Brighton Grammar School, Camberwell Grammar School, Caulfield Grammar School, Haileybury College, Ivanhoe Grammar School, Malvern Grammar School, St Thomas College and Trinity Grammar School. In 1928, Carey Baptist Grammar School also joined the AGSV. Of these ten original schools, three (Camberwell, Ivanhoe and Trinity) are still AGSV members, four (Brighton, Carey, Caulfield and Haileybury) opted to join the APS instead in 1957, two (St Thomas with Essendon Grammar School and Malvern with Caulfield) amalgamated with other schools and one (All Saints) ceased to exist in 1925.

In 1958, Assumption College, Essendon Grammar School and Mentone Grammar School joined the AGSV. In 1964, 1965 and 1971 respectively, Marcellin College, The Peninsula School and Yarra Valley Grammar School joined the AGSV. In 1977, Essendon Grammar School amalgamated with the Penleigh Presbyterian Ladies' College to form the current Penleigh and Essendon Grammar School. Following this, there have been no changes to the membership of the AGSV (as of August 2017).

The AGSV has provided annual Summer and Winter sports since its formation in 1920, as well as annual competitions in Swimming and Athletics amongst other sports.

In 1968, the AGSV and the APS established an annual Tennis competition between the best Tennis players in both associations. In 2000, this was extended to all Summer and Winter sports, and has remained an annual tradition since. Following every Summer and Winter season, the top-performing students in both the AGSV and the APS compete against each other in the annual competition between the two associations.

In 2001, the AGSV and the APS coordinated to form a combined AGSV/APS girls' sport program. This was mainly done to provide opportunities for fair competition to female students of schools from both associations. Of the twenty AGSV/APS schools, twelve are co-educational, eight are boys-only and none are girls-only. As such, most of the sporting competitions are dominated by boys and the opportunities for girls' sport are relatively limited in both associations. The AGSV/APS girls competition runs for the Summer and Winter seasons (not applying to the Athletics, Swimming or other sport that is contested outside the main seasons) and is separate from the boys competition, which remains AGSV-only.

In 2009, Troy Rowe (a former employee of Ivanhoe Grammar School) was appointed as the Executive Officer of the AGSV, a role he has held since.

Member schools

Athletics Premiers

Badminton Results

See also 
 List of schools in Victoria, Australia

External links
 Associated Grammar Schools of Victoria

 
Australian school sports associations